Rahatabad may refer to:
 Rahatabad, Isfahan
 Rahatabad, Tehran